The 2000 Major League Soccer season was the fifth season of Major League Soccer. It was also the 88th season of FIFA-sanctioned soccer in the United States, and the 22nd with a national first-division league.

Overview

Changes from 1999

Most notably the 2000 season marked the first time in Major League Soccer history (and the first season of American first division soccer since 1974), that ties were allowed to stand. Following a ten-minute sudden death extra time, rather than going to a penalty shoot-out, if two teams were tied, the tie would stand. Also, the league adopted the IFAB-standard running clock, as well as injury time.

Additionally, the league broke into three separate divisions, the East, Central and West divisions. The league would use this format until 2002, when the two Florida franchises, Tampa Bay Mutiny and Miami Fusion folded.

Stadiums and locations

Standings

Eastern Division

Central Division

Western Division

Overall standings

Fixtures and results

Note: * = Match required extra time

MLS Cup Playoffs

Bracket

Points systemWin = 3 Pts.Loss = 0 Pts.Draw = 1 Pt.
ASDET*=Added Sudden Death Extra Time (Game tie breaker)SDET**=Sudden Death Extra Time (Series tie breaker)Teams will advance at 5 points.

Quarterfinals

Kansas City Wizards advance 7–1 on points.

Chicago Fire advance 6–3 on points.

MetroStars advance 6–0 on points.

Los Angeles Galaxy advance 6–0 on points.

Semifinals

Chicago Fire advance 6-3 on points.

Kansas City Wizards advance 1–0 in series overtime (SDET) after 4–4 tie on points.

MLS Cup

Player awards

End-of-season awards

Player statistics

Top goal scorers

Attendance

International Competition
2000 CONCACAF Champions' Cup

Los Angeles GalaxyDefeated  Real C.D. España 5-3 in PK, 0-0 draw (Quarter-finals).Defeated  D.C. United 4-2 in PK, 1-1 draw (Semi-finals).Defeated  C.D. Olimpia 3-2 in regulation (Final).
D.C. UnitedDefeated  L.D. Alajuelense 2-1 (Quarter-finals).Lost  Los Angeles Galaxy 4-2 in PK, 1-1 draw (Semi-finals).

Coaches

References

MLS Site

 
Major League Soccer seasons
1